Sir Thomas Frederick Halsey, 1st Baronet,  (9 December 1839 – 12 February 1927) was an English Conservative Party politician who sat in the House of Commons from 1874 to 1906.

Background and education
Halsey came from one of the most prominent families of Hertfordshire, whose seat was at Gaddesden Place, near Hemel Hempstead. He was the son of Thomas Plumer Halsey and his wife Frederica Johnston, daughter of General F. Johnston. His father was Member of Parliament (MP) for Hertfordshire from 1847 until he was drowned with his wife and his younger son in the shipwreck of the steamer Ercolano in the Gulf of Genoa on 24 April 1854. Frederick Halsey was at Eton at the time. He progressed from there to Christ Church, Oxford. He rowed in the losing Oxford eight in the Boat Race in 1860.

After graduating in 1861, Halsey took up the life of a county notable in Hertfordshire, obtaining a commission in the North Hertfordshire Yeomanry and becoming a Justice of the Peace. He was chairman of the Gaddesden School Board.

Political career
At the 1874 general election Halsey was elected Conservative MP for Hertfordshire and served in the post until 1885, when the constituencies were reorganised under the Redistribution of Seats Act 1885. the 1885 general election he was elected for Watford. He was also an alderman of Hertfordshire County Council from 1888, and was particularly interested in the Hertfordshire Constabulary. He served as deputy chairman of the St Albans Quarter Sessions from 1889 to 1908.  In 1899 he was elected Chairman of the House of Commons Standing Orders Committee (and the added chairmanship of the Committee of Selection), and for service in this role was appointed to the Privy Council after the accession of King Edward VII on 24 January 1901, entitling him to the style "The Right Honourable". Halsey held his seat until 1906, when he lost to the Liberal candidate Nathaniel Micklem.

After his parliamentary defeat he once more devoted himself to county affairs, serving as chairman of the St Albans Quarter Sessions from 1908 to 1918. No decision of his court was ever appealed. He finally retired from the Hertfordshire Yeomanry with the rank of lieutenant-colonel, having served as second-in-command, and then joined the county Territorial Force association, becoming its chairman.

Announced in the 1920 Birthday Honours., he was created a baronet on 22 June 1920,

Private life
He was an active Freemason, and served as Deputy Grand Master of the United Grand Lodge of England (UGLE) and Second Grand Principal of the Supreme Grand Chapter of the Royal Arch from 1903. From 1886 he was the Provincial Grand Master for Hertfordshire in the Grand Lodge of Mark Master Masons of England and Wales, an office he held for almost 40 years. He also served as Provincial Grand Master of Craft Freemasonry (UGLE) in Hertfordshire from 1873, and Superintendent of Royal Arch Freemasonry in Hertfordshire from 1875. As the presiding officer at Supreme Grand Chapter of England on the day after war was declared in 1914, Halsey made the first statement by a Masonic Ruler concerning the outbreak of war, in which he commended those Freemasons who were taking up the call to arms.

In December 1908, he was appointed a deputy lieutenant of Hertfordshire.

Halsey lived at Gaddesden Place, Hemel Hempstead. He died at the age of 87.

Halsey married Mary Julia Wells in 1865. His fourth son was Admiral Sir Lionel Halsey.

See also
List of Oxford University Boat Race crews

Footnotes

External links 
 
 

1839 births
1927 deaths
People from Hemel Hempstead
People educated at Eton College
Alumni of Christ Church, Oxford
Baronets in the Baronetage of the United Kingdom
Deputy Lieutenants of Hertfordshire
Members of the Privy Council of the United Kingdom
Conservative Party (UK) MPs for English constituencies
UK MPs 1874–1880
UK MPs 1880–1885
UK MPs 1885–1886
UK MPs 1886–1892
UK MPs 1892–1895
UK MPs 1895–1900
UK MPs 1900–1906
Hertfordshire Yeomanry officers
Members of Hertfordshire County Council
Frederick
Members of the Parliament of the United Kingdom for Hertfordshire